The Copa Panamericana 2007 was a minor football club tournament organized by DIRECTV between July 16 and July 22 in the University of Phoenix Stadium in Glendale, Arizona, United States. 
The tournament was divided in two groups of three, who played each other once, with the top club in each group progressing to the final match. The champion, Cruz Azul, received $250,000.

Competing clubs
 Alianza Lima
 Boca Juniors
 Caracas FC
 Club América
 Cruz Azul
 Deportivo Cali

Venue
All seven matches were held at the University of Phoenix Stadium, with a total capacity of some 70,000 people.

Groups

Group 1

Group 2

Final

Champion

Goalscorers
3 Goals
 Israel López (Cruz Azul)

2 Goals
 Federico Insúa (América)
 Miguel Sabah (Cruz Azul)
 Mauro Boselli (Boca Juniors)

1 Goal
 Ever Espinoza (Caracas)
 Leonel Vielma (Caracas)
 Martín Palermo (Boca Juniors)
 Jesús Dátolo (Boca Juniors)
 Diego Valdéz (Deportivo Cali)
 César Delgado (Cruz Azul)

Statistics

External links
 https://web.archive.org/web/20070714050952/http://www.copapanamericana2007.com/

2007
Soccer in Arizona
2007–08 in Mexican football
2007–08 in Argentine football
2007 in Colombian football
2007 in Peruvian football
2007 in Venezuelan sport